Susanne Link is a retired German swimmer who won three gold medals in the 4×100 m freestyle relay at the European and world championships in 1981–1983.

References

Living people
German female swimmers
World Aquatics Championships medalists in swimming
European Aquatics Championships medalists in swimming
Year of birth missing (living people)
German female freestyle swimmers